Vanderlei Silva may refer to:

 Wanderlei Silva, Brazilian mixed martial arts fighter
 Vanderlei Fernandes Silva, also known as Derlei, Brazilian football player
 Vanderlei Silva de Oliveira, Brazilian football player